Psiguria is a genus of flowering plants belonging to the family Cucurbitaceae.

Its native range is Mexico to Tropical America.

Species:

Psiguria pedata 
Psiguria racemosa 
Psiguria ternata 
Psiguria triphylla 
Psiguria umbrosa 
Psiguria warscewiczii

References

Cucurbitaceae
Cucurbitaceae genera